Sophie Maurer (born 3 January 1994) is a Luxembourger football forward who formerly played for the Luxembourg women's national football team.

References

External links 
 

1994 births
Living people
Luxembourg women's international footballers
Luxembourgian women's footballers
Women's association football forwards